The 2019–20 Sunderland A.F.C. season was the club's 141st season in existence, and their second consecutive season in the third tier of English football, after relegation from the Championship in the 2017–18 season. Along with competing in League One, the club participated in the FA Cup and EFL Cup as well as the EFL Trophy. The season covers the period from 1 July 2019 to 30 June 2020. On 3 April, the English Football League decided to postpone all football until safe to do so due to the COVID-19 pandemic, and on  9 June, clubs voted to curtail the season, meaning the final table would be calculated by a points-per-game method with the play-offs being played behind closed doors.

First team squad

Pre-season friendlies
As of 12 June 2019 Sunderland has announced three preseason friendlies against South Shields, Benfica B, and Belenenses.

Competitions

League One

League table

Result summary

Results by matchday

Matches
On Thursday, 20 June 2019, the EFL League One fixtures were revealed.

FA Cup

The first round draw was made on 21 October 2019.

EFL Cup

The first round draw was made on 20 June. The second round draw was made on 13 August 2019 following the conclusion of all but one first round matches. The third round draw was confirmed on 28 August 2019, live on Sky Sports. The draw for the fourth round was made on 25 September 2019.

EFL Trophy

On 9 July 2019, the pre-determined group stage draw was announced with Invited clubs to be drawn on 12 July 2019.

Group A

Squad statistics

Top scorers

Appearances and goals
 

|-
|colspan="14"|Players who have played for Sunderland this season but are currently out on loan:

|-
|colspan="14"|Players who have played for Sunderland this season but have left the club:

|-
|}

Disciplinary record

Transfers

Transfers in

Loans in

Loans out

Transfers out

References

Sunderland
Sunderland A.F.C. seasons